The following elections occurred in the year 1813.

Europe
  1813 Spanish general election

North America

United States
 1813 New York gubernatorial election
 United States Senate election in New York, 1813

See also
 :Category:1813 elections

1813
Elections